Alan Belmont Cobham (4 November 192728 June 2011) was an American mathematician and computer scientist known for (with Jack Edmonds) inventing the notion of polynomial time and the complexity class P, for Cobham's thesis stating that the problems that have practically-usable computer solutions are characterized by having polynomial time, and for Cobham's theorem on the sets of numbers that can be recognized by finite automata. He also did foundational work on automatic sequences, invented priority queues and studied them from the point of view of queueing theory, and wrote a program for playing contract bridge that was at the time (in the mid-1980s) one of the best in the world.

Cobham was a student at Oberlin College, the University of Chicago, the University of California, Berkeley, and the Massachusetts Institute of Technology, but did not complete a doctorate. He became an operations researcher for the United States Navy, a researcher for IBM Research at the Thomas J. Watson Research Center, and a professor and founding department chair of the computer science department at Wesleyan University.

Selected publications

References 

1927 births
2011 deaths
American mathematicians
Theoretical computer scientists
IBM Research computer scientists
Wesleyan University faculty